Breaking the Code is a 1996 BBC television movie directed by Herbert Wise, based on the 1986 play by Hugh Whitemore about British mathematician Alan Turing, the play thematically links Turing's cryptographic activities with his attempts to grapple with his homosexuality.

Plot
The story focuses on the life of the English mathematician Alan Turing, who helped decode the Enigma code, used by the Germans to send secret orders to their U-boats in World War II. He also was one of the key contributors to the development of the digital computer. Turing was also a homosexual in Britain at a time when it was illegal.

Cast
Derek Jacobi as Alan Turing
Alun Armstrong as Mick Ross
Blake Ritson as Christopher Morcom
Prunella Scales as Sara Turing
Harold Pinter as John Smith
Richard Johnson as Dilwyn 'Dilly' Knox
Amanda Root as Patricia 'Pat' Green

Production

Development
Derek Jacobi starred in an eight-month run of the play at the Theatre Royal, Haymarket in London's West End beginning on 21 October 1986, and he stayed with the play when it ran on Broadway in New York City from 15 November 1987, to 10 April 1988.

Broadcast
It was broadcast by the BBC on 2 February 1996, and in the United States by PBS on Masterpiece Theatre. A producer's cut was released on DVD in 2012.

Reception
It won a Broadcasting Press Guild Award and was nominated for two BAFTA TV awards, for best single drama and best actor, and for a GLAAD Media Award.

References

External links
 
 Breaking the Code movie trailer

Cultural depictions of Alan Turing
BBC television dramas
Bletchley Park
Enigma machine
British LGBT-related television films
Plays by Hugh Whitemore
Cryptography in fiction
Biographical films about mathematicians
1996 television films
1996 films
Films directed by Herbert Wise
1990s British films